Raseborg is a town (administrative area) and municipality of Finland. It was created on January 1, 2009, when the municipalities of Ekenäs, Karis and Pohja were consolidated into a single town. Of these, Ekenäs now serves as the administrative center of Raseborg. The name of the new town is based on the Raseborg Castle located in Ekenäs, or formerly in the municipality of Snappertuna. Historically the name of the county was also Raseborg in the 14th century.

The town is bilingual, the majority of the town being Swedish-speakers, taking up two-thirds of the population (66.2%) and Finnish-speakers being the minority, which approximately takes up the remaining one-third of the population (31%).

The coat of arms of Raseborg, introduced in 2009, is inspired by the area's grove biotope and the eight former municipalities that originally belonged to the united municipality, which are symbolized by white windflowers arranged in a circle. The yellow wall crown on top of the green shield in the area therefore belongs to the history of the region and its the three fortresses (inclunding the Raseborg Castle). In addition to the coat of arms, the town of Raseborg uses a flag and pennon based on the coat of arms. The coat of arms has attracted criticism for its "non-heraldic structure".

In February 2011, Raseborg Municipality entered into a "Friendship Co-operation Agreement" with Makana Municipality in South Africa. The project, which is to last three years, seeks to facilitate information sharing in the fields of economic development, arts and culture, women's development, youth development, and education.

History 

Raseborg as a municipal name is a new coinage, but the castle of Raseborg was first mentioned in 1378 as Rasaborge. It acted as the center of the Raseborg slottslän (Finnish: linnalääni) covering western Uusimaa and some parts of Finland Proper such as Kisko.

The area of the modern municipality had eight municipalities at its peak: Ekenäs, Ekenäs landskommun, Snappertuna, Karis, Karis landskommun, Pohja, Tenala and Bromarv. The first merger in the area happened in 1969, when Karis landskommun was merged into Karis. By 2008, only Ekenäs, Pohja and Karis were independent municipalities, forming the modern Raseborg municipality in 2009.

Politics 
After the 2021 municipal election the municipal council of Raseborg became the following:

See also 
 Fiskars, Finland
 Ingå

References

External links 

 
 City of Raseborg – Official website 
 Makana-Raseborg - blog documenting the progress of the friendship co-operation agreement

 
Cities and towns in Finland
Populated coastal places in Finland
Populated places established in 2009